Tet Wada (born January 20, 1973) is a global actor working in Asia, Europe and North America. Wada was born in Tokyo.

Early life
Wada was born in Minato-ku, Tokyo.
He moved to the United States at the age of 18 and obtained a degree in international marketing from Baruch College in New York City.

Career
After graduating, Wada worked in a marketing role at Donna Karan New York's headquarters.  While he was a student, Wada worked as a researcher and house model for leather designer Anton, whose celebrity clients include Aerosmith, Lenny Kravitz, Sting and Alicia Keys. New York-based modeling agency Q Models saw Wada and signed him on as its first Asian model. Wada was initially not interested in modeling and continued to work at Donna Karan, but his strong Asian features and cool persona shot him to modeling fame, and Wada resigned from his marketing job.
Wada became the first Japanese male model to be featured in Vogue Paris. He was cast with top model Daria Werbowy in a widely talked about photograph of the two kissing.
Wada solidified his reputation as a leading Asian fashion artist and collaborated with world-famous photographers including Michael Thompson, Terry Richardson, Markus Klinko and Greg Lotus.
Wada also acted in numerous TV shows and movies in the U.S. and a film he had a leading role in screened at the 2012 New York City Independent Film Festival.
In 2012, Wada formally shifted his career focus to Asia.
After shooting a film in Japan, he spent 3 months in Taiwan as a main cast member of the television series Chocolat. (Chocolat aired in Japan, Taiwan, Singapore, Indonesia, and other Asian countries in 2013.)
Wada has appeared in multiple advertisement campaigns for global brands including SONY, Hewlett Packard, Motorola, SK-II, L'Oreal, Subaru, Evian, Bacardi, KOOL Cigarettes, Uniqlo, and GAP. He was booked by Uniqlo at the onset of the brand's expansion into the U.S. and European markets and appeared in its campaigns for four years.
He has appeared in ads for brands in Asia and modeled for the Diane Shampoo series from 2013 to 2015 co-starring with Yuriko Yoshitaka.
He also appeared in ad campaigns for Laundrin with Ai Tominaga and Fine Visual with Harisembon in 2018-19.

Personal life
He is fluent in Japanese, English and Spanish and learned Chinese in Taipei after being cast in Chocolat.
He is often mistaken for Japanese-American due to living overseas for a long time and because of his toned physique, but he is 100% Japanese. He values living in different countries and learning about their culture and meeting their people.
He is big on correspondence and always sends a hand-written note to close friends and family members on their birthdays. He also updates his blogs frequently.
He was always interested in English and motorcycles since he was little, and watched English TV programs in earnest. According to his blog, he decided to move to the United States when he was in elementary school after watching the American movie Smokey and the Bandit II.
During elementary school, he mastered riding a miniature Yamaha Motocross. He still rides his vintage U.S.-manufactured Honda that he rode in New York that he arranged to send back to Japan. He has said, "A motorcycle is a man's life partner in pursuing his dreams."
He is friends with New York-based exotic skin and leather artist Anton, and studied fashion by going to his studio every day. It was Anton who convinced Wada to model for the first time.
He worships Bruce Lee's way of life. He has pursued multiple martial art forms including Aikido. He has followed a workout regimen for over 20 years.  After reaching a point of doing over 1800 push-ups a day, in 2018, he switched his workout to doing pull-ups.　He has a 3rd-level blackbelt of Aikido, the Japanese martial art.

Filmography
2005 Winter Butterfly
2006 One Night with You
2008 Dungeon
2008 Tenure of Edmond Fontier
2010 Sex and the City II
2010 Wall Street II
2011 Into the New World
2012 Premium Rush
2014 Fuja
2015 S Last Policeman-Recovery of Our Future
2016 Iyana Onna (Desperate Sunflowers)
2017 Kyou no Kirakun
2018 Impossibility Defense

Television
2008 BLOODY MONDAY TBS Television (Japan)
2010 Royal Pains (USA)
2011 Lights Out (USA)
2014 Chocolat (Taiwan & 15 different Asian countries)
2015 Ashitamokitto, oishii gohan Fuji TV
2016 99.9-Keijisenmon Bengoshi TBS Television (Japan)
2017 Utsubokazura no Yume Fuji TV
2017 Anatagakokoni Irudakede RKB Mainichi Broadcasting
2018 Boys Over Flowers Season 2 TBS Television (Japan)
2022 Avataro Sentai Donbrothers TV Asahi
2022 Keishicho Kyokohankakari Higuchi Akira Season 2 TV Tokyo
2022 Kurosagi (manga) Season 2 TBS Television (Japan)

Theatre
T. Schreiber Studio New York, NY 「Fat Pig」（2014 by Peter Jensen ／Tom ）
Stella Adler Studio of Acting New York, NY 「The Performers」（2014. Paul Takacs ／Lee ）
Stella Adler Studio of Acting New York, NY 「Lone Star」（2014. Paul Takacs ／Roy ）
THE LAST SONG  (2015.　The Galaxy Theatre Tokyo　by Ryosei Kajiwara／Kida)
RADIO 311 (2016. Tokyo Metropolitan Theatre by Ryosei Kajiwara ／Tuxedo  )

Radio
Rocky's Music Salad (Jan 21, 2012）Shibuya FM, Tokyo
Sounds of Story Asada Jiro Library （Sep 13, 2014） J-Wave, Japan
ON THE PLANET (2015- 2017) Radio personality Japan FM Network (Japan)
Go Around the World (April, 28, 2021) Rainbow Town FM, Tokyo
Go Around the World (Aug 24, 2022) Rainbow Town FM, Tokyo

Modeling

Television Commercials
SUBARU Legacy (2007 USA)
UNIQLO (Japan, 2008 Korea)
Evian Mineral water (2011-13 Worldwide)
 Eruca (2014 Japan)
 Laundrin (2013-14 Japan)
 Moist Diane series (2013-15 Japan)
 Fine Visual (2018-2019 Japan)

Print Advertisements
L'Oreal (USA, Canada, Europe)
SK-II (Worldwide)
Sony Cybershot (USA)
Uniqlo (Japan、Korean、USA、England)
Gap (Japan、USA、Europe)
Puma (Germany)
Nokia (USA)
Motorola RAZR V3 (USA)
Bacardi Rum (USA)
Kool Cigarettes (USA)
Kane Cigarettes (Spain)
Baby Phat by Kimora Lee Simmons (USA)
House of Deréon by Beyonce (USA)
Baveria Beer (Netherlands)

Editorial
Vogue magazine (France、United States)

Wada was the first Japanese male model to be featured in French Vogue. Madonna was on the cover of the issue. He was photographed kissing Canadian supermodel Daria Werbowy (photographer: Terry Richardson).

GQ (USA, Taiwan)
i-D (United Kingdom)
TRACE (New York)
SURFACE (New York)
ROLLING STONE (1000th Special Collectors Issue)
GLAMOUR (United Kingdom)
FLAIR (Italia)
COMPLOT (Venezuela)
AUGUST MEN (Singapore)
Tarzan (Japan)
SUPER TOKYO by Leslie Kee etc.

Runway
Imitation of Christ (New York)
Matrix L'Oreal (New York)
Y R B (New York)
Romain Kapadia (New York)
Anton (New York)
Dr. Martens (New York)
Pierrot (New York)
Yoko Devereaux (New York)
Elisa Jimenez (New York)  etc.

Management
Wada moved back to Asia in 2012 and lived in Taiwan for over 3 years and has resided in Tokyo since 2015. 
He was represented by Q Models (New York & Los Angeles) http://qmanagementinc.com from 2001 to 2011 and by CAJ (2012–2018), and is now represented by Anthem-Pro http://anthem-pro.com/

References

External links
 Tet Wada official website
 Tet Wada Blog 
 Tet Wada Official Instagram
 

1973 births
Living people
Japanese male actors
Japanese male models
Male actors from Tokyo
People from Tokyo